The 1998 FIRS Intercontinental Cup was the seventh edition of the roller hockey tournament known as the Intercontinental Cup, played in May 1998. This edition was disputed, for the first time, over one game only. FC Barcelona won the cup, defeating Unión Vecinal de Trinidad.

Match

See also
FIRS Intercontinental Cup

References

1998 in Spanish sport
International roller hockey competitions hosted by Spain
FIRS Intercontinental Cup
1998 in roller hockey